Ram Prakash Chaudhary is a Nepalese politician, belonging to the Loktantrik Samajwadi Party currently serving as the member of the 2nd Federal Parliament of Nepal. In the 2022 Nepalese general election, he won the election from Sarlahi 1 (constituency).

References

Living people
Nepal MPs 2022–present
Year of birth missing (living people)